To Norway, Home of Giants was the Norwegian contribution to the 1979 Rose d'Or in Montreux, where it won two prizes. The short comedy film was directed by Johnny Bergh and Bjørn Sand. The script was written by Knut Aunbu, Johnny Bergh, Bjørn Sand, and Erik Søby.

The film was a mock report from Norway, presented by the English reporter Norman Fearless (John Cleese). The film premiered on May 5, 1979.

Cast
John Cleese
Øivind Blunck
Ingeborg Cook
Jon Eikemo
Per Jansen
Jorunn Kjellsby
Aud Schønemann
Sverre Wilberg

References

External links
To Norway, Home of Giants at NRK

Norwegian television films
Norwegian comedy films
NRK original programming
1979 television films
1979 films
Films set in Norway
Films shot in Norway
Cultural depictions of Norwegian people
Ethnic humour
1970s English-language films